The Ussuri brown bear  (Ursus arctos lasiotus), also known as the Ezo brown bear, Russian grizzly bear,  or the black grizzly bear, is a subspecies of the brown bear or a population of the Eurasian brown bear (U. a. arctos). One of the largest brown bears, a very large Ussuri brown bear may approach the Kodiak bear in size. It is not to be confused with the North American grizzly bear.

Appearance

It is very similar to the Kamchatka brown bear, though it has a more-elongated skull, a less-elevated forehead, somewhat-longer nasal bones and less-separated zygomatic arches, and is somewhat darker in color, with some individuals being completely black, which once led to the now-refuted speculation that black individuals were hybrids of brown bears and Asian black bears. They can occasionally reach greater sizes than their Kamchatkan counterparts; the largest skull measured by Sergej Ognew (1931) was only slightly smaller than that of the largest Kodiak bear (the largest subspecies of brown bears) on record at the time.

Behaviour and biology

Dietary habits
Although the diet of an Ussuri brown bear is mainly vegetarian, being a large predator it is able to kill any prey in its habitat. In Sikhote Alin, Ussuri brown bears den mostly in burrows excavated into hillsides, though they, on rare occasions, den in rock outcroppings or build ground nests. These brown bears rarely encounter Ussuri black bears, as they den at higher elevations and on steeper slopes than the latter species. They may, on rare occasions, attack their smaller black relatives. 

In middle Sakhalin in spring, brown bears feed on the previous year's red bilberry, ants, and flotsam, and at the end of the season, they concentrate on the shoots and rhizomes of tall grasses. On the southern part of the island, they feed primarily on flotsam, as well as insects and maple twigs. In springtime in Sikhote Alin, they feed on acorns, Manchurian walnuts, and Korean nut pine seeds. In times of scarcity, in addition to bilberries and nuts, they feed on larvae, wood-boring ants, and lily roots. In early summer, they strip bark from white-barked fir trees and feed on the cambium and sap. They also eat berries from honeysuckle, yew, Amur grape, and buckthorn. In southern Sakhalin, their summer diet consists of currants and chokeberries. In August n the middle part of the island, fish comprise 28% of their diet.

In Hokkaido, the brown bears' diet includes small and large mammals, fish, birds, and insects such as ants.

Non-aggressive interactions with humans
On Shiretoko Peninsula, especially in the area called "Banya", many females with cubs often approach fishermen and spend time near people. This unique behavior was first noted more than a half century ago, with no casualties or accidents ever recorded. The females are thought to take cubs to approach fishermen to avoid encountering aggressive adult males.

Interspecific competitions

Adult bears are generally immune to predatory attacks except from tigers and other bears. 

Following a decrease of ungulate populations from 1944 to 1959, 32 cases of Siberian (Amur) tigers attacking both Ussuri brown (Ursus arctos lasiotus) and Ussuri black bears (U. thibetanus ussuricus) were recorded in the Russian Far East, and hair of bears were found in several tiger scat samples. Tigers attack black bears less often than brown bears, as the latter live in more open habitats and are not able to climb trees. In the same time period, four cases of brown bears killing female tigers and young cubs were reported, both in disputes over prey and in self-defense. Tigers mainly feed on the bear's fat deposits, such as the back, hams and groin.

When Amur tigers prey on brown bears, they usually target young and sub-adult bears, besides small female adults taken outside their dens, generally when lethargic from hibernation. Predation by tigers on denned brown bears was not detected during a study carried between 1993 and 2002. Ussuri brown bears, along with the smaller black bears constitute 2.1% of the Siberian tiger's annual diet, of which 1.4% are brown bears.

The effect the presence of tigers has on brown bear behavior seems to vary. In the winters of 1970–1973, Yudakov and Nikolaev recorded two cases of bears showing no fear of tigers and another case of a brown bear changing path upon crossing tiger tracks. Other researchers have observed bears following tiger tracks to scavenge tiger kills and to potentially prey on tigers. Despite the threat of predation, some brown bears actually benefit from the presence of tigers by appropriating tiger kills that the bears may not be able to successfully hunt themselves. Brown bears generally prefer to contest the much smaller female tigers. During telemetry research in the Sikhote-Alin Nature Reserve, 44 direct confrontations between bears and tigers were observed, in which bears (not just brown bears) in general were killed in 22 cases, and tigers in 12 cases. There are reports of brown bears specifically targeting Amur leopards and tigers to abstract their prey. In the Sikhote-Alin reserve, 35% of tiger kills were stolen by bears, with tigers either departing entirely or leaving part of the kill for the bear. Some studies show that bears frequently track down tigers to usurp their kills, with occasional fatal outcomes for the tiger. A report from 1973 describes twelve known cases of brown bears killing tigers, including adult males; in all cases the tigers were subsequently eaten by the bears.

Range and status
The Ussuri brown bear is found in the Ussuri Krai, Sakhalin, the Amur Oblast, the Shantar Islands, Iturup Island, and Kunashir Island in Siberia, northeastern China, the Korean Peninsula, and Hokkaidō in Japan. Until the 13th century, bears inhabited the islands of Rebun and Rishiri, having crossed the La Pérouse Strait to reach them. They were also present on Honshu during the last glacial period, but were possibly driven to extinction either by competing with Asian black bears or by habitat loss due to climate change. There have been several hypotheses regarding the crossing of Blakiston's Line by brown bears; there could be three genetic groups, distinct for at least 3 million years which reached to Hokkaido via Honshu at different times, or brown bears from Hokkaido reached to Honshu.

About 500–1,500 Ussuri brown bears are present in Heilongjiang, and are classed as a vulnerable population. Illegal hunting and capture have become very serious contributing factors to the decline in bear numbers, as their body parts are of high economic value.

Five regional subpopulations of Ussuri brown bears are now recognized in Hokkaido. Of these, the small size and isolation of the western Ishikari subpopulation has warranted its listing as an endangered species in Japan’s Red Data Book. About 90 to 152 brown bears are thought to dwell in the West Ishikari Region and from 84 to 135 in the Teshio-Mashike mountains. Their habitat has been severely limited by human activities, especially forestry practices and road construction. Excessive harvesting is also a major factor in limiting their population.
In 2015, the Biodiversity Division of the Hokkaido government estimated the population as being as high as 10,600.

In Russia, the Ussuri brown bear is considered a game animal, though it is not as extensively hunted as the Eurasian brown bear.

In Korea, a few of these bears still exist only in the North, where this bear is officially recognized as a natural monument by its government. Traditionally called ku'n gom (big bear), whereas black bears are called gom (bear), the Ussuri brown bear became extinct many years ago in South Korea largely due to poaching. In North Korea, the two major areas of brown bear population include Ja Gang Province and the Ham Kyo'ng Mountains. The ones from JaGang are called "RyongLim ku'n gom" (RyongLim big bear) and they are listed as Natural Monument No.124 of North Korea. The others from Hamkyo'ng Mountains are called GwanMoBong Ku'n Gom (GwanMo Peak big bear) and they are listed as Natural Monument No.330 of North Korea. All big bears (Ussuri brown bears) in North Korea are mostly found around the peak areas of mountains. Their average size varies from 150 kg to 250 kg for Ryonglim bears found in the area south of Injeba'k Mountain, up to 600 kg for the ones found in the area north of Injeba'k Mountain.

Attacks on humans
In Hokkaido during the first 57 years of the 20th century, 141 people died from bear attacks, and another 300 were injured. The , which occurred in December 1915 at Sankei in the Sankebetsu district, was the worst bear attack in Japanese history, and resulted in the deaths of seven people and the injuring of three others. The incident is frequently referred to in modern Japanese bear incidents, and is believed to be responsible for the Japanese perception of bears as man-eaters.

From 1962 to 2008, 86 attacks and 33 deaths occurred from bears in Hokkaido.

Cultural associations
The Ainu people worship the Ussuri brown bear, eating its flesh and drinking its blood as part of a religious festival known as Iomante.

References

External links

Eurasian brown bears
Carnivorans of Asia
Mammals of Asia
Mammals of Japan
Mammals of Russia
Fauna of Siberia
Mammals of Korea